Parks Victoria is a government agency of the state of Victoria, Australia.

Parks Victoria was established in December 1996 as a statutory authority, reporting to the Victorian Minister for Environment and Climate Change. The Parks Victoria Act 2018 updates the previous act, Parks Victoria Act 1998. Under the new Act Parks Victoria is responsible for managing over  '...4 million hectares including 3,000 land and marine parks and reserves making up 18 per cent of Victoria’s landmass, 75 per cent of Victoria’s wetlands and 70 per cent of Victoria’s coastline'.

History
Parks Victoria replaced many of the functions and absorbed the staff of the then Department of Natural Resources and Environment (which managed National and State parks) and Melbourne Parks & Waterways, which itself was originally part of the former Melbourne and Metropolitan Board of Works, which mostly managed urban parklands, some of which were formerly MMBW facilities, such as Braeside Park.

The Department of Natural Resources and Environment itself was part of a succession of government departments, originating back to a number of entities including the Forests Commission Victoria, the Crown Lands and Survey Department, National Park Service, Soil Conservation Authority and Fisheries and Wildlife Service.

Notable heritage properties and historic places
 Cape Otway Lightstation
 Gabo Island
 Oriental Claims Historic Area
 Werribee Park
 Wilsons Promontory
 The Twelve Apostles

See also
Australasian Fire and Emergency Service Authorities Council

References

External links
 Parks Victoria

Government agencies of Victoria (Australia)
1996 establishments in Australia
Protected area administrators of Australia